Saloni (Hindi : सलोनी) is a female name of Indian origin, which means "beautiful", "charming" and "unique".

Notable people with the name include:
 Saloni (actress) (1950–2010), Pakistani actress
 Saloni Aswani (born 1987), Indian actress and model
 Saloni Chopra (born 1991), Indian-born Australian actor and model
 Saloni Daini (born 2001), Indian actress and comedian
 Saloni Gaur (born 1999), Indian comedian  and impressionist.

Hindu given names
Indian feminine given names
Pakistani feminine given names